Macduff may refer to:

Fictional characters 
 Macduff (Macbeth), a character in Shakespeare's Macbeth
 Lady Macduff, wife of Macduff in Macbeth
 Macduff's son in Macbeth
 Donald MacDuff, a character in Wee Willie Winkie
 Keiran MacDuff, a character in the Star Trek: The Next Generation episode "Conundrum"
 Richard MacDuff, a character in the Douglas Adams book Dirk Gently's Holistic Detective Agency

People 
 Clan MacDuff, a Scottish clan
 Macduff of Fife (fl. 1297–1298), figure in the Wars of Scottish Independence
 Alistair MacDuff (born 1945), British judge of the High Court of England and Wales
 Isabella MacDuff, Countess of Buchan (fl. 1306–1313), figure in the Wars of Scottish Independence
 Jack MacDuff (born 1950), Canadian air traffic controller and curler
 John Ross Macduff (1818–1895), Scottish divine and author
 Larry Mac Duff (born 1948), American football coach
 Macduff Everton (born 1947), American photographer

Places 
 Macduff, Aberdeenshire, Scotland, a town
 Macduff Lifeboat Station
 Macduff railway station
 MacDuff, Ontario, Canada, a community

Other uses 
 Marquess of Macduff and Earl of Macduff, titles attached to the title Duke of Fife in the Peerage of the United Kingdom
 MacDuff's Cross, Fife, Scotland, ancient monument
 Macduff's Castle, Fife, Scotland, ruined castle
 Macduff Distillery, Deveron, Scotland
 MacDuff v JCI, a case in South African contract law
 Scottish Feudal Barony of MacDuff, resulting in the change of the name of the Scottish town of Doune to Macduff, by Crown Charter

See also 
 McDuff, a surname